Diana Mezuliáníková (born 10 April 1992 in Bruntál) is a Czech middle-distance runner specialising in the 1500 metres. She finished 7th at the 2015 European Indoor Championships and 10th at the 2018 European Championships.

International competitions

Personal bests
Outdoor
600 metres – 1:30.43 (Kolin 2014) NR
800 metres – 2:01.36 (Szczecin 2018)
1000 metres – 2:44.72 (Andorf 2016)
1500 metres – 4:03.70 (Tokyo 2021)
3000 metres – 9:32.78 (Kladno 2015)
Indoor
800 metres – 2:02.50 (Ostrava 2019)
1000 metres – 2:43.91 (Prague 2017)
1500 metres – 4:11.53 (Ostrava 2017)
3000 metres – 9:12.63 (Mondeville 2017)

References

1992 births
Living people
Czech female middle-distance runners
People from Bruntál
Competitors at the 2015 Summer Universiade
Athletes (track and field) at the 2019 European Games
European Games silver medalists for the Czech Republic
European Games medalists in athletics
Athletes (track and field) at the 2020 Summer Olympics
Olympic athletes of the Czech Republic
Sportspeople from the Moravian-Silesian Region
20th-century Czech women
21st-century Czech women